Bohemian Football Club Women, more commonly referred to as Bohemians or Bohs, is an Irish association football club based in Dublin. In February 2020 the Football Association of Ireland (FAI) announced the formation of the club as an expansion team for the upcoming 2020 Women's National League season. It is the women's section of Bohemian FC. The senior team plays in the Women's National League while a junior team competes at Women's Under 17 National League and Women's Under 19 National League level.

History 
On 27 November 2018 Bohemians were accepted into the Under-17 Women's National League, beginning with the 2019 season. Their aim was to grow the number of girls and women members in the club and eventually compete in the Women's National League. The historic first game in the Under-17 Women's National League for Bohemians was played on 13 April 2019 against Cork City and ended in 0–2 defeat.

Just one year after being accepted to compete in the Under-17 Women's National League, Bohemians were accepted to the Women's National League on 18 February 2020. The first match was originally scheduled for 15 March 2020, however, the team was made to wait until 8 August 2020 due to the COVID-19 pandemic in the Republic of Ireland which delayed the start of the season. The game ended in a 4–1 defeat by Wexford Youth. Chloe Darby scored the consolation goal and wrote herself into the history books as Bohemians' first-ever goalscorer.

Following a series of narrow defeats, Bohemians' inexperienced side finished bottom of the nine-team table in a truncated 2020 WNL season. In the off-season the club launched a third team to compete in the new Under-19 Women's National League and announced plans to pay first team players' expenses. After finishing sixth in the 2021 WNL season, the club announced that they would play all their 2022 home fixtures at Dalymount Park, instead of at the Oscar Traynor Centre where they had been based previously.

Players

Current squad

Player of the Year

Management team

{|class="wikitable"
|-
!Position
!Staff
|-
|Senior Manager/Coach|| Sean Byrne
|-
|Senior Assistant manager/Goalkeeping coach|| Pat Trehy
|-
|Assistant coach|| Derek O'Neill
|-
|Strength & Conditioning coach|| Dave O'Brien
|-
|Physio|| Vincent Fitzpatrick
|-

Records

 First goalscorer Chloe Darby (8 August 2020 vs Wexford Youths in the Women's National League)

References

Women
Association football clubs established in 2020
Association football clubs in Dublin (city)
2020 establishments in Ireland
Women's association football clubs in the Republic of Ireland
Women's National League (Ireland) teams